Karim Zedadka (born 9 June 2000) is an Algerian footballer who plays for Italian club Napoli.

Club career
In 2018, Zedadka signed for Italian Serie A side Napoli from Nice in France amid interest from English Premier League club Leicester City. He was called up to Napoli's senior squad on several occasions in the 2018–19 Serie A season, but did not appear on the field.

In 2020, he was sent on loan to Cavese in the Italian third-tier Serie C. The loan was terminated in January 2021 due to Zedadka's injury.

On 26 August 2021, he went to Charleroi on loan.

International career
Despite being born in France, he has expressed desire to represent Algeria internationally.

References

External links
 

2000 births
People from Pertuis
Sportspeople from Vaucluse
French sportspeople of Algerian descent
Living people
French footballers
Association football wingers
Association football midfielders
Association football defenders
S.S.C. Napoli players
Cavese 1919 players
R. Charleroi S.C. players
Championnat National 2 players
Serie C players
Belgian Pro League players
French expatriate footballers
Expatriate footballers in Italy
Expatriate footballers in Belgium
Footballers from Provence-Alpes-Côte d'Azur